Hadjadj is a town and commune in Mila Province, Algeria.

Hadjadj may also refer to:

El Hadjadj, a town in Chlef Province, Algeria
Fabrice Hadjadj (born 1971), French writer and philosopher
Fodil Hadjadj (born 1983), Algerian football player

See also